LVK or lvk may refer to:

 Landssamanslutninga av Vasskraftkommunar, a Norwegian interest group
 LVK, the IATA code for Livermore Municipal Airport, California, United States
 lvk, the ISO 639-3 code for Lavukaleve language, Solomon Islands